Matthew Christopher Celano Uy (born March 22, 1990) is an American born Filipino footballer who last played for Filipino side Team Socceroo in the United Football League.  He has also been capped by the Philippines national team.

Early life
Uy was born in the United States to a Filipino father and an Italian mother. He represented NYC Italy in the 2012 Cosmos Copa and is a full international for the Philippines national team.

Career
In the late days of March, he was waived by the Global of the United Football League in the transfer window. He was then immediately signed by the Loyola Meralco Sparks. He made his debut for the Sparks on April 9, 2013 coming in as a substitute for Jeong Byeong-Yeol in the 72nd minute against the Stallion Sta. Lucia.

References

External links

1990 births
Living people
Filipino people of Italian descent
Filipino footballers
Filipino expatriate footballers
Philippines international footballers
American soccer players
American sportspeople of Filipino descent
Fairfield Stags men's soccer players
Westchester Flames players
Long Island Rough Riders players
Global Makati F.C. players
USL League Two players
United States men's youth international soccer players
F.C. Meralco Manila players
People from New Hyde Park, New York
Soccer players from New York (state)
Association football midfielders
Team Socceroo F.C. players